Elizabeth of the Palatinate (16 November 1483, Heidelberg – 24 June 1522, Baden-Baden) was a member of the House of Wittelsbach and a Countess Palatine of Simmern and by marriage, successively Landgravine of Hesse-Marburg and Margravine of Baden.

Life 
Elizabeth was a daughter of the elector Philip (1448–1508) from his marriage to Margaret of Bavaria (1456–1501), daughter of Duke Louis IX. of Bavaria-Landshut.

She first married on February 12, 1496 in Heidelberg with Landgrave William III of Hesse-Marburg (1471–1500). The nuptials took place in 1498 in Frankfurt am Main.  The marriage tied William III closer to the Palatinate house while his cousins in Kassel were considered to be partisans of the Emperor.  In the event he would die without an heir, William had promised Elizabeth almost the entire county of Katzenelnbogen as wittum.  However, when William III died, his whole territory, including Katzenelnbogen, was inherited by his cousin William II of Hesse-Kassel.  The Palatinate party then proposed that Elisabeth should marry William II.  William declined, and married a princess close to the House of Habsburg.  William II also participated in the imperial ban against Elisabeth's father and brother, because of the dispute over Elisabeth's wittum.

Three years after the death of her first husband Elisabeth married on January 3, 1503 in Heidelberg with Margrave Philip I of Baden-Sponheim (1479–1533).  In a contract concluded in 1508 with respect to Elizabeth's dowry, it was stipulated that the part of Sponheim that Baden had ceded to the Palatinate in 1463, was to be returned to Baden.

Elizabeth died on June 14, 1522 and was buried in the Collegiate Church in Baden-Baden.

Offspring 
From her second marriage to Margrave Philip of Baden Elisabeth had the following children:
 Marie Jakobäa (1507–1580)
 married in 1522 Duke William IV of Bavaria (1493–1550)
 Philipp (1508–1509)
 Philipp Jakob (* / † 1511)
 Eva Marie (* / † 1513)
 Johann Adam (* / † 1516)
 Max Kaspar (* / † 1519)

References 
 Hermann Wiesflecker: Emperor Maximilian I: the Empire, Austria and Europe at the turn of the Modern Age, Oldenbourg Wissenschaftsverlag, 1986, p. 29
 Historical Society of the Grand Duchy of Hesse: Archive for Hessian History and Archaeology, volume 11, privately published by the Historical Society for the Grand Duchy of Hesse, 1867, p. 141 ff
 Pauline Puppel: The Regent: guardianship rule in Hessen 1500-1700, Campus Verlag, 2004, p. 158 ff
 Georg Wilhelm Justin Wagner: Statistical-topographic-historical description of the Grand Duchy of Hesse, Volume 4, CW Leske, 1831, p. 22
 Gerhard Kattermann: Margrave Philip I of Baden (1515–1533) and his chancellor, Dr. Hieronymus Veus, GH Nolte, 1935, p. 5 ff

Footnotes 

Landgravines of Hesse
House of Wittelsbach
1483 births
1522 deaths
Burials at Stiftskirche, Baden-Baden
Daughters of monarchs
Remarried royal consorts